Vladimir Nekora (10 August 1938 – 24 January 2004) was a Croatian rower. He competed in the men's coxed four event at the 1960 Summer Olympics.

References

1938 births
2004 deaths
Croatian male rowers
Olympic rowers of Yugoslavia
Rowers at the 1960 Summer Olympics